The Government of Montenegro (Влада Црне Горе) is the executive branch of state authority in Montenegro. It is headed by the prime minister. It consists of the prime minister, the deputy prime ministers as well as the ministers.

Dritan Abazović is the current Prime Minister of Montenegro and the Head of Government. The current members of the cabinet were elected on 28 April 2022, by the Parliament of Montenegro.

Current ministries 
Each minister of each ministry reports to the Prime Minister. Ministries in the current 43nd composition of the Government of Montenegro (2022–present):
 Ministry of Justice and Human and Minority Rights
 Ministry of Public Administration, Digital Society and Media
 Ministry of Foreign Affairs
 Ministry of Interior Affairs
 Ministry of Defense
 Ministry of Education, Science, Culture and Sports
 Ministry of Finance and Social Welfare
 Ministry of Economy
 Ministry of Capital Investments
Ministry of Health
 Ministry of Ecology, Spatial planning and Urbanism
 Ministry of Agriculture and Rural Development

Current composition

Government history
List of governments of Montenegro (independent country, 2006-present)

See also 
 Politics of Montenegro
 Parliament of Montenegro
 President of Montenegro

External links 
 Government of Montenegro, Official website (Montenegrin)

References

 
European governments